Sepak takraw competitions at the 2021 Southeast Asian Games took place at Hoàng Mai District Sporting Hall in Hanoi, Vietnam from 13 to 21 May 2022.

Participating nations

 (host)

Medal table

Medalists

Men

Women

References

Sepak takraw
2021